Kevin Curren and Jim Grabb were the defending champions but only Grabb competed that year with Patrick McEnroe.

Grabb and McEnroe lost in the semifinals to Jorge Lozano and Todd Witsken.

Lozano and Witsken won in the final 6–3, 5–7, 6–3 against Rick Leach and Jim Pugh.

Seeds
All eight seeded teams received byes to the second round.

Draw

Final

Top half

Bottom half

External links
 1989 Stockholm Open Doubles Draw

Doubles